1701 Naval Air Squadron of the Fleet Air Arm of the Royal Navy was formed in February 1945 at RNAS Lee-on-Solent as an amphibian bomber reconnaissance squadron. It was equipped with the Supermarine Sea Otter, and the squadron joined HMS Begum in April 1945 bound for the Far East.

The squadron was intended to join the newly established Mobile Naval Air Bases for Air Sea Rescue duties. B Flight joined MONAB IV (HMS Nabaron) at Ponam in the Admiralty Islands in May 1945 and embarked in HMS Reaper in October 1945.  A Flight joined MONAB VI (HMS Nabstock) at  Maryborough, Queensland, Australia in June 1945.

Aircraft flown
1701 Naval Air Squadron flew only one aircraft type:

Supermarine Sea Otter

References

External links
 

1700 series Fleet Air Arm squadrons
Military units and formations established in 1945